Kabataang Makabayan ("Patriotic Youth"), also known by the acronym KM, is an underground communist youth organization in the Philippines which was active from 1964 to 1975. It was banned by the Philippine government in 1972 when then-President Ferdinand Marcos declared martial law, and was driven underground. It was dissolved in 1975 along with other National Democratic mass organizations, as part of the National Democratic movement's change of strategy against the Marcos regime. Revived within the Manila-Rizal area in 1977 and later nationally in 1984, the organization continues to exist.

History
Kabataang Makabayan originated from the Students' Cultural Association of UP (SCAUP) in the University of the Philippines and was initially organized as the youth arm of the Partido Komunista ng Pilipinas-1930 by José María Sison, Ernesto Macahiya, Nilo Tayag, and others. Sison envisioned the youth group as revolutionaries who would establish a country led by the working class instead of oligarchic politicians. It was established on November 30, 1964, Bonifacio Day, to emphasize continuity with Andrés Bonifacio's 1896 Philippine Revolution. Nacionalista Senator Lorenzo Tañada gave the closing speech at the KM's first national congress and was both a consultant and honorary member.

When Sison re-established the Communist Party of the Philippines (CPP) in 1968 as a consequence of the First Great Rectification Movement, the New People's Army (NPA) was organized as its military wing; Kabataang Makabayan then became the CPP's youth arm. It was also one of the groups that established the National Democratic Front of the Philippines.

First Quarter Storm

Kabataang Makabayan was at the forefront of the First Quarter Storm, a period of civic unrest consisting of violent demonstrations, protests, and marches against the government of then-President Ferdinand Marcos from January to March 1970. The protests and subsequent violence they inspired collectively became one major factor that led to Marcos’ declaration of Martial Law in late September 1972.

Philippine government estimates place Kabataang Makabayan membership at 10,000–30,000 during its peak.

See also 
Anakbayan
Bagong Alyansang Makabayan
Diliman Commune
Kabataan Partylist
League of Filipino Students
Malayang Pagkakaisa ng Kabataang Pilipino
Student Movement Philippines (1965–1972)

External links
Kabataang Makabayan calls on the youth to join the armed struggle
Kabataang Makabayan commemorate 51st founding anniversary in Davao City

References

History of the Philippines (1965–1986)
Student politics
Communist militant groups
Youth organizations based in the Philippines
Youth wings of communist parties
Youth organizations established in 1964
Clandestine groups
National Democratic Front of the Philippines